Karl Böhm or Carl Böhm (1882-1942) was a German art director who designed the sets for a number of films during the Nazi era.

Selected filmography
 Such a Rascal (1934)
 Light Cavalry (1935)
 The Schimeck Family (1935)
 Tango Notturno (1937)
 Gordian the Tyrant (1937)
 The Secret Lie (1938)
 Dangerous Crossing (1937)
 Secret Code LB 17 (1938)
 Freight from Baltimore (1938)
 The Merciful Lie (1939)
 Midsummer Night's Fire (1939)
 Uproar in Damascus (1939)
 My Daughter Doesn't Do That (1940)

References

Bibliography 
 Giesen, Rolf.  Nazi Propaganda Films: A History and Filmography. McFarland, 2003.

External links 
 

1882 births
1942 deaths
People from Sulęcin
German art directors